The Demon Barbers are an English folk band who predominantly draw on traditional material for their repertoire while fusing traditional folk instruments with drums and electric bass guitar. The band is particularly well known for its energetic live performances, winning "Best Live Act" at the BBC Radio 2 Folk Awards 2009 and being nominated for the same award in 2011.

Band members
 Damien Barber – lead vocals, guitar, English concertina, C#/D button accordion
 Bryony Griffith – lead vocals, fiddle
 Will Hampson – melodeon, harmonica
 Angus Milne – bass guitar
 Ben Griffith – drums

Ex members
 Lee Sykes - bass gutar
Max Ross – bass guitar

Discography

Albums
 Uncut (2002)
 Waxed (2005)
 The Adventures of Captain Ward (2010)
 Disco at the Tavern (2015)

Mini-albums
 +24db (2008)

References

External links 
 The Demon Barbers Website

English folk musical groups